The United Nations Civilian Police Support Group (UNPSG) was a United Nations peacekeeping operation monitoring the performance of the Croatian police in the Danube region from 16 January 1998 to 15 October 1998. The mission was active in the same area of the former parallel Eastern Slavonia, Baranja and Western Syrmia which was previously directly governed by the UNTAES transitional administration between 1996 and 1998. The mission took over vehicles, equipment and other
support assets from UNTAES. UNPSG was not the first CIVPOL engagement in the region as earlier missions of UNPROFOR, UNCRO and UNTAES all included civilian police components.

The United Nations Security Council authorised the mission in United Nations Security Council Resolution 1145 on 19 December 1997. There was in 114 police officers supported by international and local civilian staff coming from Argentina, Austria, Denmark, Egypt, Fiji, Finland, Indonesia, Ireland, Jordan, Kenya, Lithuania, Norway, Poland, Russian Federation, Sweden, Switzerland, Ukraine and United States. The mission cooperated with the OSCE Mission to Croatia which was active in the region at the same time.

See also 
 United Nations Police

References

Further reading 

 

United Nations operations in Europe
1998 establishments in Croatia
1998 disestablishments in Croatia
United Nations operations in the former Yugoslavia
Croatia and the United Nations